On 25 April 2015, Wahidur Rahman (also known as Yasir Rizvi), a Pakistani professor at University of Karachi and journalist was killed by four people who were on a motorcycle.

See also
 Killing of Sibte Jafar

References

2015 deaths
Muhajir people
Deaths by person in Pakistan
People from Karachi
Targeted killings in Pakistan
2015 murders in Pakistan
People murdered in Karachi
Assassinated Pakistani people
Deaths by firearm in Sindh
Academic staff of the University of Karachi